Vasile Andrei (born 28 July 1955) is a retired heavyweight wrestler from Romania. He competed in Greco-Roman wrestling at the 1980, 1984 and 1988 Olympics and won a bronze medal in 1980 and a gold medal in 1984. At the 1984 Olympics he also placed sixth in freestyle wrestling, and in 1980 and 1988 served as flag bearer for Romania at the opening ceremony. At the world and European championships he won six medals in Greco-Roman wrestling between 1979 and 1987.

Andrei took up wrestling at Progresul Bucuresti coached by Dumitru Pârvulescu and later moved to Steaua București. After retiring from competitions he worked as a wrestling coach, and in 2000 trained the Tunisian national team.

References

1955 births
Living people
People from Ialomița County
Olympic wrestlers of Romania
Wrestlers at the 1980 Summer Olympics
Wrestlers at the 1984 Summer Olympics
Wrestlers at the 1988 Summer Olympics
Romanian male sport wrestlers
Olympic gold medalists for Romania
Olympic bronze medalists for Romania
Olympic medalists in wrestling
World Wrestling Championships medalists
Medalists at the 1984 Summer Olympics
Medalists at the 1980 Summer Olympics
Universiade medalists in wrestling
Universiade silver medalists for Romania
European Wrestling Championships medalists
Medalists at the 1981 Summer Universiade